Tego may refer to:

Tego (toego), Bhutanese clothing
Tego film, an adhesive sheet used in the manufacture of waterproof plywood
Tego Calderón, Puerto Rican rapper and actor
Tego, Queensland, a town in the Shire of Paroo, Australia